Nicholas Ware (February 16, 1776September 7, 1824) was a United States senator from Georgia.

Ware was born in Caroline County, Virginia and later moved with his parents to Edgefield, South Carolina and a few years later to Augusta, Georgia. He received a thorough English education and studied medicine. He studied law in Augusta as well as at the Litchfield Law School in Litchfield, Connecticut. He was admitted to the bar and commenced practice in Augusta.

From 1808 to 1811 and in 1814–1815, Ware was a member of the Georgia House of Representatives. He was elected as mayor of Augusta, serving from 1819 to 1821. That year the Georgia legislature elected him as a Democratic-Republican (later as a Crawford Republican) to the U.S. Senate to fill the vacancy caused by the resignation of Freeman Walker; he served from November 10, 1821, until his death in New York City in 1824. Ware was interred under the annex of Grace Church.

He was a planter and slave owner. At the time of the 1820 census, he owned 62 slaves and had extensive plantation near Augusta. He developed it for cotton, the major commodity crop of the Deep South in the antebellum era.

He married Susan Brooks Savage, with whom he had two children, Robert Alexander Ware (May 10, 1807 – July 19, 1893) and Susan Margaret Ware (February 14, 1815 – September 1, 1887). His daughter, Susan, first married a man named Crouch; after being widowed, she married Francis W. Eppes of Tallahassee, Florida.

See also
 Gertrude Herbert Institute of Art ("Ware's Folly"), Ware's former home
 List of United States Congress members who died in office (1790–1899)

References

External links

1776 births
1824 deaths
United States senators from Georgia (U.S. state)
Members of the Georgia House of Representatives
Georgia (U.S. state) lawyers
Mayors of Augusta, Georgia
Litchfield Law School alumni
Democratic-Republican Party United States senators
Georgia (U.S. state) Democratic-Republicans
American slave owners
19th-century American lawyers

United States senators who owned slaves